A ghorfa ( room) is a vaulted room used by Berbers for storing grain. They are often stacked as multistory structures, sometimes reaching four stories high. Traditionally, the rooms were grouped together as a ksar, a fortification used by Berber villages in the Maghreb to store large amounts of grain.

In popular culture
Ghorfas were featured prominently in the film Star Wars: Episode I – The Phantom Menace as the slave quarters of Mos Espa, home to Anakin Skywalker. These scenes in the film show ghorfas from several locations in southern Tunisia, including Ksar Ouled Soltane and Ksar Hadada. A Ghorfa in Malta could also mean a lonely room in a field, a bedroom, any kind of storage room, an animal shelter or other functional traditional rooms.

See also
 Gasr Al-Hajj
 Ksar Ouled Soltane
 Chenini
 Douiret
 Menzel (Djerba)

References

Sources 
 Lonely Planet Tunisia, 3rd edition

Rooms
Berber architecture
Granaries